Beta-carotene 3-hydroxylase (beta-carotene 3,3'-monooxygenase, CrtZ) is an enzyme with systematic name beta-carotene,NADH:oxygen 3-oxidoreductase . This enzyme catalyses the following chemical reaction

 beta-carotene + 2 NADH + 2 H+ + 2 O2  zeaxanthin + 2 NAD+ + 2 H2O (overall reaction)
(1a) beta-carotene + NADH + H+ + O2  beta-cryptoxanthin + NAD+ + H2O
(1b) beta-cryptoxanthin + NADH + H+ + O2  zeaxanthin + NAD+ + H2O

Beta-carotene 3-hydroxylase requires ferredoxin and Fe(II).

References

External links 
 

EC 1.14.13